Patricia Jean "Patty" Van Wolvelaere (divorced Johnson; born April 15, 1950) is a retired hurdler from the United States who competed at the 1968 and 1972 Summer Olympics Olympics. Her best finish was the fourth place in the 80 m event in 1968. She won the 100 m hurdles at the 1971 Pan American Games and held four national outdoor titles in this event, in 1971, 1973–74 and 1977. Van Wolvelaere also won the National Indoor Championships in the 60 yard hurdles six times between 1967 and 1974, including four in a row in 1971–74.

Van Wolvelaere graduated from Renton High School and competed for the University of Southern California and Angels Track Club. She later worked as a firefighter. More recently, with the married last name of Weirich, she coaches at Ramona High School.

In 2017, she was inducted into the National Track and Field Hall of Fame.

References

1950 births
Living people
American female hurdlers
Athletes (track and field) at the 1968 Summer Olympics
Athletes (track and field) at the 1972 Summer Olympics
Athletes (track and field) at the 1971 Pan American Games
Olympic track and field athletes of the United States
Pan American Games gold medalists for the United States
Pan American Games medalists in athletics (track and field)
Track and field athletes from San Diego
Medalists at the 1971 Pan American Games
21st-century American women